Thomas Maxwell Davis, Jr. (January 14, 1916 – September 18, 1970), was an American rhythm and blues saxophonist, arranger, bandleader and record producer.

Biography
Davis was born in Independence, Kansas in 1916. In 1937, he moved to Los Angeles, California, playing saxophone in the Fletcher Henderson orchestra. After some years playing swing and jazz, he became more involved in the West Coast R&B scene in the mid-1940s, becoming a regular session musician and arranger for the fast-growing independent record labels such as Aladdin. He also recorded with the Jay McShann band, featuring the blues shouter Jimmy Witherspoon. By 1952, Davis had played on numerous R&B hits by Percy Mayfield, Peppermint Harris, Clarence "Gatemouth" Brown, T-Bone Walker, Amos Milburn, and others. He also arranged and played on Little Willie Littlefield's 1952 "K. C. Lovin'" for Federal Records.

In 1955, he left Aladdin and joined the Bihari brothers at Modern Records (and its subsidiaries RPM, Crown and Kent) as musical director and a producer. As the Biharis' main band leader, Davis arranged the music and found the musicians. Although his success rate started to diminish thereafter, he became regarded as an elder statesman and as "the father of West Coast R&B".

"Maxwell Davis is an unsung hero of early rhythm and blues," noted the songwriter and producer Mike Stoller. "He produced, in effect, all of the record sessions for Aladdin records, Modern records, all the local independent rhythm and blues companies in the early 1950s, late 1940s in Los Angeles."

His final recording activity was in 1969, as the producer of the soul singer Z. Z. Hill.

Davis died from a heart attack, in Los Angeles, California, in September 1970.

Discography

As sideman
With B.B. King
1956: Singin' the Blues (Crown)

References

1916 births
1970 deaths
Record producers from Kansas
Songwriters from Kansas
People from Independence, Kansas
American male saxophonists
Rhythm and blues saxophonists
Four Star Records artists
Modern Records artists
RPM Records (United States) artists
West Coast blues musicians
20th-century American businesspeople
20th-century American saxophonists
20th-century American male musicians
Aladdin Records artists
American male songwriters